is a Japanese football player. He plays for Arterivo Wakayama.

Career
Kento Kato was promoted from youth team to the top team of the J2 League club Fagiano Okayama in 2014. On February 28, 2016, he debuted on opening game of the 2016 season (v Renofa Yamaguchi FC).

In February 2019, Kato joined Thespakusatsu Gunma. He was loaned out to Veertien Mie on 15 August 2019.

In February 2020, he then moved to Kansai Soccer League club Arterivo Wakayama.

Club statistics
Updated to 23 February 2018.

References

External links

1995 births
Living people
Association football people from Okayama Prefecture
Japanese footballers
J2 League players
Japan Football League players
Fagiano Okayama players
Ococias Kyoto AC players
Thespakusatsu Gunma players
Veertien Mie players
Arterivo Wakayama players
Association football midfielders